The 1969 Dutch Grand Prix was a Formula One motor race held at the Zandvoort Circuit on June 21, 1969. It was race 4 of 11 in both the 1969 World Championship of Drivers and the 1969 International Cup for Formula One Manufacturers. The 90-lap race was won by Matra driver Jackie Stewart after he started from second position. Jo Siffert finished second for the Lotus team and Ferrari driver Chris Amon came in third.

Qualifying

Qualifying classification

Race

Classification

Championship standings after the race

Drivers' Championship standings

Constructors' Championship standings

Note: Only the top five positions are included for both sets of standings.

References

Further reading

Dutch Grand Prix
Dutch Grand Prix
Grand Prix
Dutch Grand Prix